The Last Train from Madrid is a 1937 American war drama film directed by James P. Hogan and starring Dorothy Lamour, Lew Ayres and Gilbert Roland. It is set during the Spanish Civil War. The film was one of the few contemporary Hollywood films made about the war.

Plot

The story of seven peoples' lives and love affairs in Madrid during the Spanish Civil War.

Cast

 Dorothy Lamour as Carmelita Castillo
 Lew Ayres as Bill Dexter
 Gilbert Roland as Eduardo de Soto
 Karen Morley as Helene Rafitto
 Lionel Atwill as Colonel Vigo
 Helen Mack as Lola
 Robert Cummings as Juan Ramos
 Olympe Bradna as Maria Ronda
 Anthony Quinn as Captain Ricardo Alvarez
 Lee Bowman as Michael Balk
 Francis Ford as Pedro Elias
 Alan Ladd as Soldier 
 Evelyn Brent as Woman soldier
 Jack Perrin as Guard
 Robert Emmett O'Connor as Secret Service Man
 Louis Natheaux as Headwaiter
 Rollo Lloyd as Hernandez
 Nigel De Brulier as Philosopher 
 Gordon De Main as Gonzalez
 Louise Carter as Rosa Delgado 
 Maurice Cass as Waiter
 Hooper Atchley as Martin
 Francis McDonald as Mora
 George MacQuarrie as Driver 
 Carl Harbaugh as Militiaman 
 Otto Hoffman as Fernando
 Stanley Fields as Avila

Production
In 1936, it was reported that Paramount had acquired the property as a vehicle for Cary Grant. However, Grant did not sign a new contract and left the studio later that year.

As with Love Under Fire, another film about the Spanish Civil War in production at the time, the filmmakers were careful not to take sides. Paramount executives described it as a "sort of a Grand Hotel theme." The production experienced several issues with the Hays Office because of the political aspects of the subject.

Filming took place in April and May 1937, mainly at Paramount's studios and at the Iverson Ranch, although some secondary location shooting took place in Palencia in Castille. The sets were designed by the art directors Earl Hedrick and Hans Dreier.

Reception
Writing for Night and Day magazine in 1937, Graham Greene offered an unfavorable review, describing The Last Train from Madrid as "probably the worst film of the decade." Greene criticized the film's acting and noted that rather than experiencing the dialogue's intended "emotional and uplifting" message, he found it humorous.

The New York Times suggested that the film should not be seriously regarded: "True, it treats of the Spanish Revolution, but merely as Hollywood has in the past regarded the turmoils of Ruritania and Zenda."

References

Bibliography
 Schindler, Colin. Hollywood in Crisis: Cinema and American Society 1929-1939. Routledge, 2005.
 Kear, Lynn & King, James. Evelyn Brent: The Life and Films of Hollywood's Lady Crook. McFarland & Co, 2009.

External links

The Last Train from Madrid at Time out

1937 films
Paramount Pictures films
Films directed by James Patrick Hogan
Spanish Civil War films
American black-and-white films
American war drama films
1930s war drama films
Films set in Madrid
1930s English-language films
1937 drama films
1930s American films